Tjaša Šrimpf (born 29 July 1994) is a former tennis player from Slovenia.

In her career, she won one singles title on the ITF Women's Circuit. In 2013, she reached her best singles ranking of world No. 630 and peaked at No. 866 in the doubles rankings.

In February 2013, Šrimpf made her debut for the Slovenia Fed Cup team, playing in four rubbers of the Europe/Africa Group I. She won a doubles match against Luxembourg, but lost all three of her round-robin singles ties. In the first game of her match against Bulgaria's Tsvetana Pironkova, she had to retire injured.

Her last match on the ITF Women's Circuit she has been playing in a tournament in Antalya in February 2014.

ITF finals

Singles (1–1)

Doubles (0–1)

Fed Cup participation

Singles

Doubles

References

External links
 
 
 

1994 births
Living people
Sportspeople from Maribor
Slovenian female tennis players